Sisaket was a female professional volleyball team based in Sisaket, Thailand. In the past, Tapaphaipun Chaisri served as team captain.

Honours
 Thailand League :
  Runner-up : 2013–14
 Thai-Denmark Super League :
  Third : 2014

Former squad

Notable players
Domestic Players

  Jarunee Sannok
  Piyamas Koijapo
  Khwanjira Yuttagai
  Pornpun Guedpard
  Jutarat Montripila
  Tikamporn Changkeaw
  Utaiwan Kaensing
  Anisa Yotpinit
  Jurairat Ponleka
  Phiangphit Sankaew
  Patcharee Deesamer
  Kanittha Juangjan
  Alisa Sengsane 
  Tapaphaipun Chaisri 
  Chitaporn Kamlangmak
  Narumon Khanan
  Sineenat Phocharoen

References

External links
 Official fanpage

Volleyball clubs in Thailand
Volleyball clubs established in 2012
Sports clubs disestablished in 2015